Henry Man (died 1556) was an English bishop.

Henry Man is also the name of:

Henry Man (MP) for Salisbury
Henry Man (writer) (1747–1799), English author

See also
Henry Mann (disambiguation)
Henry Manne (1928–2015), American writer and academic